Murderworld is a fictional amusement park appearing in American comic books published by Marvel Comics. Murderworld was designed by the supervillain known as Arcade as a place to sadistically murder others via using carnival-themed robotics and traps, in some ways this makes it similar to a Circus of Fear archetype but it is specifically designed to be an execution camp.

Publication history
Murderworld first appeared in Marvel Team-Up #66 (February, 1978).

Fictional history
Rather than being a single location, Murderworld is the name given to the fairground/amusement park style deathtrap used by the assassin-for-hire Arcade. Utilizing sophisticated robotic and holographic systems, Arcade has frequently pitted various superheroes against Murderworld, sometimes for money and sometimes merely for the challenge. Arcade has built Murderworlds under Manhattan, on a Caribbean island, in Antarctica, in England, and numerous other locations around the world.

First Murderworld
The first known Murderworld was built underground beneath an amusement park in Manhattan. A large portion of this Murderworld was a large scale pinball machine used as a prelude to shake up his victims, but it also contained trapdoors, mazes, booby traps, and a variety of killer robotics.

When the Maggia hired Arcade as an assassin, Spider-Man, Captain Britain and his love interest Courtney Ross became the first visitors to Murderworld. Although they escaped and destroyed a large portion of Murderworld, Arcade vowed to rebuild it bigger and better than before.

Hired by Black Tom and Juggernaut, Arcade was able to capture the X-Men off the streets of New York City to have them battle inside Murderworld. With some effort, the X-Men were able to escape and rescue Colleen Wing, Betsy Wilford, and Amanda Sefton, who had been captured alongside them.

When Arcade was captured by Doctor Doom, the reserve X-Men Iceman, Havok, Polaris and Banshee travelled to Murderworld to rescue several hostages taken by Arcade's aide Ms. Locke. Despite Ms. Locke and Mr. Chamber's efforts, the X-Men were again able to escape. Mystique later made a deal with Arcade to use Murderworld as training ground for her Brotherhood of Mutants. Shadowcat and Colossus found themselves trapped in Murderworld once when Arcade recruited them to save his life from Doctor Doom. However, Doom was revealed to a robot controlled by Miss Locke, who was allowed to try and kill Arcade on his birthday. Nightcrawler had to infiltrate Murderworld once when Arcade abducted and trapped Judith Rassendyl, the heiress to the royal throne of Ruritania. The original X-Factor had to brave the hazards Murderworld once to save the mutant son of Arcade's therapist. Courtney Ross was later again trapped in Murderworld, but she managed to escape death thanks to Excalibur's help and her own newly discovered talent at improvised comedy.

X-Force
After leaving Camp Verde, Cable and Domino decided to use Arcade's abandoned Murderworld as the new base of operations for X-Force. Murderworld provided a secure base and training area underground, but still offered access to Manhattan making an ideal headquarters. Not long after X-Force took up residency in Murderworld, Arcade remotely detonated explosives hidden within it, destroying most of the structure.

New Warriors
When Night Thrasher reformed the New Warriors with depowered mutants, he used the abandoned Murderworld as their base of operation. Together Night Thrasher, Kaz and Grace rebuild and converted the Murderworld mechanics into a new Danger Room for the new New Warriors to train.

Sentience
Years later, Kitty Pryde and Vision were trapped in the remains of this original Murderworld. They were brought there by the Murderworld mainframe, which had gained sentience and wanted to commit suicide.

Doorway to Destiny
When working with the Crazy Gang, Arcade kidnapped Courtney Ross because she escaped from his previous Murderworld. Arcade created a theatre and Wonderland inspired Murderworld called The Doorway to Destiny. However, Courtney Ross was rescued by Excalibur. Captain Britain and Shadowcat continued to have multiple run-ins with Arcade and his Murderworld.

Mutant Town
To kill Rictor and destroy X-Factor Investigations, the former Purifiers Mr. Taylor hired Arcade to build a Murderworld in inside the closed Power Plant bar in the heart of Mutant Town. Although the members of X-Factor escaped, this Murderworld led to the complete destruction of Mutant Town.

Murder Island
Using robot disguised as Kraven the Hunter, Arcade and White Rabbit captured Wolverine and Black Cat and released them on Murder Island where they were hunted by several millionaires who paid for the opportunity to hunt the world's most dangerous game. After destroying the Kraven robot and facing many of the island's perils, Wolverine and Black Cat escape and capture Arcade and White Rabbit, and, as revenge, they leave the pair stranded in the Savage Land.

Years later, Arcade gave this island to Miss Coriander, who renamed the isle Coriander Island.

Nightmare Team-Up
When Arcade's assassination business began to suffer because of Deadpool stealing his customers, Arcade teamed-up with Nightmare to get revenge. Nightmare agreed to help Arcade create a virtual reality/dream realm Murderworld as long as Hercules would also be a prisoner. Together they created a labyrinth, but Deadpool was able to awake from the dream state by plunging a knife into his head severing the two hemispheres of his brain.

Warehouse Murderworld
To demonstrate his Murderworld arsenal to potential clients and to restore his reputation, Arcade captured the students from the Avengers Academy and the Young Allies from New York City and pitted them against his Murderworld. Fortunately, by working together, the young heroes were able escape.

Concert
Following the events of Necrosha, Arcade was hired by Mortis to capture her sister, Dazzler. To capture her, Arcade designed a concert hall and attacked her with robots versions of powerful supervillains. Although Arcade escaped, Mortis was captured.

Toy Store
Arcade once opened a toy store in New York City with Impossible Man where he sold lethal toys to unsuspecting customers. The Human Torch, Franklin Richards, and Leech battled Arcade's toys and closed his store.

Arena Murder World
After realizing he was a joke among the super villain community and hitting rock bottom, Arcade decided to build massive island arena underground in Antarctica with the assistance of Miss Coriander. With the designs of the arena completed, Arcade exercised total control over the environment and terrain of his new Arena Murderworld.

As the next part of his plan, he kidnapped sixteen superpowered teens and forced them into a 30-day game of kill or be killed. Unbeknownst the participants, their every move was being filmed. Several individuals died including Mettle, Red Raven, Juston Seyfert, Kid Briton, Nara, and Apex while the survivors were left physically, emotionally, and psychologically scared. The survivors vowed to never share the secrets of their experience in Murderworld with anyone. However, Arcade released his footage of Murderworld onto the internet making the survivors reluctant celebrities.

Massacrer Casino
After releasing the videos of his Arena Murderworld, Arcade went into hiding in Bagalia as revealed in the pages of Avengers Undercover. To pass time and raise funds, Arcade opened the Massacrer Casino where wealthy individuals can engage in a game of kill or be killed. This lasted until some of the survivors of Arena Murderworld tracked him down, and Hazmat killed him (this was later revealed to have been a clone of Arcade that was created by the Masters of Evil while the real Arcade was imprisoned in Bagalia by them).

Dungeon Murderworld

Realizing that mercenaries have less to fight for than heroes who always escape his traps, Arcade put out an add for them and lured them into a castle-dungeon role playing situation. Most notably Gwenpool and her friends Batrock the leaper, MegaTony, and the Terrible Eye (a.k.a. Sarah), a group of mutant-frog mercenaries Batroc worked with once (much to his chagrin), and Deadpool (referred to as "The Unkillable beast" and wearing a green Robinhood style cap). Things went downhill quickly however since Gwen was a geek back in her home world and thus knew all the tricks of working her way through an RPG with record speed, especially after she killed the shopkeeper-robot who offered to sell them dungeon raiding equipment and just took what she wanted, including their own gear. A good thing since Deadpool and, according to Arcade, many other mercenaries had been trapped and died there over a long period of time. After a brief misunderstanding with Deadpool she quickly led him and her team to Arcade's hiding place and took him down.

Miscellaneous

At one time, Arcade experimented with what he called "video murder machines". He would use a light beam to remotely capture his targets who would be recreated in a virtual Video Game environment. On the one instance that these machines were depicted, Arcade was attempting to abduct the X-Men, but instead, unknowingly abducted four of the Micronauts, a team with whom he was unfamiliar but nevertheless regarding it as an opportunity to test his video murder machines. Arcturus Rann, Devil, Microtorn, and Nanotron were digitally transported to an individual virtual world which resembled popular video games of the time.  The Micronauts were eventually able to escape when Microtron hacked into the system, although Arcade would himself escape. The method in which they were abducted and the nature of this environment is reminiscent of the then recent 1982 film Tron.

Former residents
 Arcade
 Miss Locke
 Mr. Chambers
 Miss Coriander
 X-Force
 Domino
 Cable (Nathan Summers)
 Rictor (Julio Richter)
 Boomer (Tabby Smith)
 Cannonball (Sam Guthrie)
 Shatterstar (Gaveedra Seven)
 Warpath (Jimmy Proudstar)
 Siryn (Terry Rourke)
 New Warriors
Wondra (Jubilation Lee)
 Skybolt (Vincent Stewart)
 Blackwing (Barnell Bohusk)
 Ripcord (Miranda Leevald)
 Night Thrasher
 Tempest
Decibel
 Longstrike (Christine Cord)
 Phaser (Christian Cord)
 Grace
 Kaz
 Renaissance
 Aja
 Avengers Academy
 Hazmat
 X-23 (Laura Kinney)
 Reptil
 Mettle (Ken Mack)
 Juston Seyfert
 Juston's Sentinel
 Runaways
 Nico Minoru
 Chase Stein
 Darkhawk (Chris Powell)
 Cammi
 Death Locket
 Braddock Academy
 Anachronism (Aiden)
 Nara
 Apex (Katy Bashir)/Tim Bashir
 Cullen Bloodstone
 Kid Briton (Brian Braddock)
 Red Raven (Dania)

Other versions

Ultimate Universe
In the Ultimate Marvel reality, Murderworld is a first-person shooter video game designed by Arcade and the source of his fortune.

Age of X
In the Age of X reality, Alcatraz Island was a prison for dangerous mutants. Governor Harcourt Teesdale served as the director-governor. Known to his inmates as Arcade, he created mutant-themed attractions to torture and punish prisoners, which earned Alcatraz the nickname "Murderworld". A mutant named the Basilisk was used as an unwilling executioner for years until he was able to escape, murder Arcade, and free the mutants imprisoned there.

Deadpool Kills the Marvel Universe
When Deadpool started a super human killing spree, he captured and forced Arcade to build him a new Murderworld with deadlier traps than ever in order to kill the X-Men.

In other media

Television
 An alternate version of Murderworld appears in the X-Men: Evolution episode "Fun and Games".  Webber Torque (or "Arcade", as he calls himself), a student from Bayville High School, manages to infiltrate the Xavier Institute's Danger Room; and, mistakenly believing it to be a video game simulation, he alters it into a Murderworld.
 Murderworld appears in the Ultimate Spider-Man episode "Game Over." Here, it has been named Madland. Spider-Man, Captain America, and Wolverine are forced to traverse through Madland in order to get to Arcade and prevent him from starting World War III.
 Murderworld appears in the M.O.D.O.K. episode "O, Were Blood Thicker Than Robot Juice!" After kidnapping MODOK's family, Arcade and the young, time-displaced version of MODOK bring them to Murderworld. When MODOK arrives to rescue them, he finds both his family and multiple robotic copies, with Arcade and the younger MODOK forcing the family to kill each other's copies until only one version of themselves is left. Ultimately, the family is able to kill their copies, with the exception of a single robot copy of MODOK's son Lou, kill the younger MODOK (actually a robot copy), and escape Murderworld.

Video Games
 Murderworld is the setting for X-Men: Madness in Murderworld, a single-player side-scrolling arcade game developed by Paragon Software in 1989.
 Murderworld appears in Marvel: Ultimate Alliance. When the heroes used Doctor Strange's Orb of Teleportation to travel to Castle Doom, they were diverted by Baron Mordo to Murderworld where they arrived in a fake Castle Doom. It was also revealed that Arcade has Senator Robert Kelly in Murderworld and Jean Grey was shown to be under Arcade's mind-control when found in a tent. The heroes fought their way through Rhino and Shocker where they end up fighting Arcade in his Arcade-Bot. Some of the Simulation Disks take place in Murderworld. In Deadpool's disk, Arcade is irritated greatly by Deadpool's refusal to accept that Murderworld isn't a normal theme park, and forces the mercenary to fight Dark Spider-Man (who Arcade referred to as his creation). In Black Panther's disk, Arcade threatens Black Panther to give the secret codes to Wakanda's vibranium facility and forces Black Panther to fight Dark Captain America. Storm's disk has her fight against Hussa in Murderworld. The versus Mysterio simulator take place in Murderworld. Mister Fantastic's disk has his fight against Bulldozer in Murderworld.
 Murderworld is a location in the mobile game Marvel Snap. Marvel characters who stay at the Murderworld location get destroyed at the end of turn 3.

References

Characters created by Archie Goodwin (comics)
Fictional technology
Fictional murderers
Marvel Comics supervillains
X-Men
Holography in fiction